"Sweet Afton" is a lyrical poem describing the Afton Water in Ayrshire, Scotland. It was written by Robert Burns in 1791 and set to music by Jonathan E. Spilman in 1837, under the title Flow gently, sweet Afton. This poem was originally published by Burns in the Scots Musical Museum as a song, still sung today as published (see external links below).

"Sweet Afton" contains a number of monosyllables, which contribute to a gentle, soothing rhythm.  It can be seen as a hymn for peace.  The poem is in the metre 11 - 11 - 11- 11. The University of South Carolina uses this song as the melody for their alma mater, "We Hail Thee Carolina".

The song is sung by Mary Bennett (played by Marsha Hunt) in the 1940 version of Pride and Prejudice.  It is also mentioned in Chapter IX of MacKinlay Kantor's Pulitzer Prize-winning novel Andersonville (1955). In the Andy Griffith Show episode “Mayberry Goes Hollywood” (1961) a citizen of Mayberry sings “Sweet Afton” to serenade a visiting Hollywood film producer.

In the town of New Cumnock in East Ayrshire there is a bridge across Afton Water on the A76 upon which there is a plaque commemorating Robert Burns and his poem.

The Afton of New Cumnock gives its name to the Glen of Afton, which has connections with William Wallace, Robert the Bruce, Mary Queen of Scots (1568), and Robert Burns. The Wallace seal attached to the Lubeck Letter of 1297 gives substance to the theory that Wallace's father was from Kyle Regis (this area) and a rock formation "up the glen" is named Castle William, supposedly after the Scottish patriot's fortification.

References

External links

Digitised copy of Afton water in James Johnson's Scots Musical Museum, printed between 1787 and 1803, from National Library of Scotland. JPEG, PDF, XML versions.

Poetry by Robert Burns
Scots-language works
1791 poems
1791 in Scotland
Songs based on poems